Areej Ahmed Mohammed Salim Al Hammadi (born 13 February 1986) is an Emirati association football player who plays as a midfielder.

Club career
Al Hammadi began her career with Al Wahda before moving to Abu Dhabi Country Club in July 2016. She appeared at the 2019 WAFF Women's Clubs Championship in Aqaba, Jordan with the Abu Dhabi Country Club, scoring a brace to lead the team to victory in its final group game.

International career
In August 2015, Al Hammadi won her first cap for United Arab Emirates. She participated in the 2015 Aphrodite Cup in Cyprus, the 2018 AFC Women's Asian Cup qualification in Tajikistan, and the 2019 WAFF Women's Championship in Bahrain.

International goals

External links
 

1986 births
Living people
Sportspeople from Dubai
Emirati women's footballers
Women's association football midfielders
United Arab Emirates women's international footballers